Alenquer is a municipality in the Lisbon District, Portugal. The present Mayor is Pedro Miguel Ferreira Folgado.

History 

Alenquer received its Foral in 1212 by the hand of Infanta (Princess) Sancha, Lady of Alenquer, daughter of King Sancho I of Portugal.

Climate
Alenquer has a mediterranean climate with hot, dry summers and mild, wet winters. It has a total of 2763.9 annual hours of sunshine.

Notable residents
 Pêro de Alenquer a 15th-century Portuguese explorer of the African coast
 Damião de Góis (1502 in Alenquer – 1574) an important Portuguese humanist philosopher.
 John Smith Athelstane, 1st Count of Carnota (1813-1886 in Alenquer) a British diplomat, author, biographer and painter.

Parishes 
Administratively, the municipality is divided into 11 civil parishes (freguesias):
 Abrigada e Cabanas de Torres
 Aldeia Galega da Merceana e Aldeia Gavinha
 Alenquer (Santo Estêvão e Triana)
 Carnota
 Carregado e Cadafais
 Meca
 Olhalvo
 Ota
 Ribafria e Pereiro de Palhacana
 Ventosa
 Vila Verde dos Francos

See also
Alenquer DOC, a wine designation.

References

External links 

 Official site
Fórum Alenquer

 
Towns in Portugal
Populated places in Lisbon District
Municipalities of Lisbon District
Municipalities of Portugal